The household responsibility system, or contract responsibility system, was a practice in China, first adopted in agriculture in 1979 and officially established in 1982, by which households are held responsible for the profits and losses of an enterprise. This system, which came to replace collective farming, maintained public ownership of land and some of the means of production, but made production the responsibility of households. Households still had to contribute to state quotas but could make their own decisions about what to plant on contracted land and could sell via a multi-tier price system that included the lowest price for payment to the state up until the quota, a higher rate for above-quota sales to the state, and market price for crops allowed to be sold at fairs.

History

1977–1978: Preparation period
By the late 1970s, China's collectivization and centralization of agricultural production faced several challenges, of which the shortage of agricultural products was the most urgent and serious. Droughts in rural areas resulted in serious food supply crises in urban regions. Many farmers and members of the People's Commune began thinking about new ways of agricultural production.  In 1978, 18 households in Xiaogang, Anhui came up with a new arrangement where each household was responsible for their profit and losses of production, which was known as the first trial of the household responsibility system.

In December 1978, the Third Plenary Session of the 11th Central Committee of the Chinese Communist Party was held in Beijing. During the meeting, the Decision of the Central Committee of the Communist Party of China on Accelerating Agricultural Development was passed, which proposed "devolving production responsibility to production units". However, the policy still prohibited delegating production responsibility to households.

Initially, these policies were only allowed as an exception applicable to poor and remote areas where peasants struggled for subsistence. A political disagreement developed over whether household contracting should also be permitted in places where collective farming had performed well. Opponents of household contracting included leaders who believed it would be a backwards step ideologically, as well as provincial leaders who anticipated that household contracting would weaken mechanized agricultural production.

1979–1981: Struggling back and forth
In early 1979, the National Agriculture Council was founded, which started a heated debate over whether China should adopt the household responsibility system within the Chinese central government. In March 1979, the National Agriculture Council held the Seven Provinces and Three Counties Meeting on Agriculture Development, during which the majority of representatives displayed a supportive attitude towards this proposal. However, the opposing voices were also strong. Wang Renchong, the Head of the National Agriculture Council, kept emphasizing the advantages of the collective economy and opposing the idea. In the end, Hua Guofeng, the Chairman of the Chinese Communist Party at the time, concluded that collective production did work, yet a certain amount of flexibility was also needed. Also, Hua Guofeng agreed that "for the impoverished households in remote regions, it is appropriate to delegate to them the responsibility and rights for their production." Hua Guofeng's words were written into the official documents of the Central Committee of the Chinese Communist Party and it was the first time that the idea of household responsibility system appeared in the official document of the Central Committee of the CCP.

In January 1980, the People's Communes Management Meeting was held in Beijing. In the meeting, Zhou Yueli, the Director of the Agricultural Committee of Anhui Province, introduced the system of agriculture development in Anhui. Zhou reported that by the end of 1979, 51% of production teams had adopted the production unit responsibility system, and 10% had adopted the household responsibility system; there was a significant production growth and 25% of the underdeveloped regions asked to adopt the household responsibility system. However, Zhou's idea received severe criticism from many representatives from other regions and provoked a huge debate over whether the household responsibility system was the right approach to take. In the end, Deng Xiaoping concluded the debate with the observation that household responsibility was a highly complicated and critical issue, and that it was unlikely to reach a simple conclusion.

While the central government was still struggling with the idea, going back and forth, more and more villages went ahead and started adopting the household responsibility system. In 1979 the system was only adopted as a trial in a few regions, but in 1980, more and more places learned from these regions and developed their own household responsibility system. The growing trend caught the attention of the central leadership of China and also led the decision-makers to a reconsideration of what agricultural production system should be adopted. 

In April 1980, at the Long-term Planning Meeting of the Central Committee of CCP, Deng Xiaoping argued: "In underdeveloped and impoverished regions such as Northwestern China, Guizhou, and Yunnan province, approaches such as household responsibility system should be adopted". During another speech in May, Deng Xiaoping supported the practice of Fengyang County and Feixi County of Anhui province and said that "[s]ome colleagues worried that to practice this kind of system might hamper the development of the collective economy. I think these worries are unnecessary. Our overall direction is developing a collective economy. As long as the productivity increases and the division of labor and commodity economy develop, our collective economy will grow from a low level to a high level."

Besides the positive attitude towards the household responsibility system of Deng Xiaoping, the National Agriculture Council also conducted intense field research in Henan, Hebei, and other provinces to better understand the effectiveness and challenges of adopting the system. From 1980 to 1981, more and more collective agricultural production systems were transformed into household responsibility systems. By 1981, 51% of the households in Southeast provinces and Shandong province had already adopted the household responsibility system.

1982: Official establishment
In December 1981, the National Agricultural Work Meeting was held in Beijing, which emphasized the idea of letting people choose by themselves which systems to use. Soon later in 1982, the Central Committee of the CCP announced its "No.1 document" for the year, Minutes of The National Agricultural Work Meeting, which officially established the household responsibility system for China's agricultural production. 

The household responsibility system achieved “total victory” in 1983. The reluctance of the leadership of some provinces to adopt the system was overcome by studies showing that the peasants strongly favored being responsible for their own production, which provided important support for Premier Zhao Ziyang’s approach of “letting the masses decide for themselves in which way they want to organize the production.”  

The system was rapidly adopted nationwide and significant agricultural growth was witnessed. During the 20 years of collective agricultural production, the annual agricultural output was 30-50 billion kilograms, yet by the time of 1984, the number increased to 400 billion kilograms. At the same time, the overall agricultural GDP increased by 68% and the average income of farmers increased by 166%. 

Another success of the household responsibility system was its price stabilization effects for peasants. By 1984, the supply of grain had increased so much that the price paid by the state for the grain quote and above-quota procurement were both higher than the market price for grain. Thus, "selling the quota at the planned price was no longer a tax but a subsidy for the peasants, and selling the surplus above the quota to the state protected the peasants from bearing the whole burden of the falling market prices." Peasants were simultaneously encouraged to increase agricultural productivity while being protected from the fall of market prices caused by the production boom. The price stabilization effects of the household responsibility system's multi-track pricing were an intentional design to regulate agricultural output through state participation in the market.

The success of the household responsibility system signified a significant transition in China's economic model and opened a new era of China's agricultural economy and rural development.

Recent analyses 
According to a 2021 study, the household responsibility system improved individuals’ later-life health, education, and labor market outcomes, but it reduced human capital investment in children, making them less likely to receive education and more likely to remain in agriculture.

See also
 Township and Village Enterprises (TVE)
 Economy of China

References

《杜润生自述:中国农村体制改革重大决策纪实》(Accounts from Du Runsheng: Record of Major Decisions on China's Rural System Reform)
《邓小平文选》第二卷
 
Yan, Yunxiang. The Chinese path to individualization. The British journal of sociology, v. 61, n. 3, p. 489–512, 2010. https://onlinelibrary.wiley.com/doi/full/10.1111/j.1468-4446.2010.01323.x
 Economic history of the People's Republic of China
1980s in China
Fengyang County